Timothy G. Lowry (August 4, 1905 – February 27, 1983) was an American football player and lawyer.  He played center for the Northwestern University football team from 1923 to 1925.  At the conclusion of the 1925 football season, he became the second person to receive the Chicago Tribune Silver Football trophy as the most valuable player in the Big Ten Conference.  Red Grange was the first recipient of the trophy in 1924.  After graduating from Northwestern, Lowry became a lawyer.  He was also the secretary and treasurer of the Illinois Center Corporation at the time the Illinois Center.  He was also an alderman in Evanston, Illinois.  Lowry died in 1983 at age 77.

References

1905 births
1983 deaths
American football centers
Northwestern Wildcats football players